The 1970 Úrvalsdeild karla was the 19th season of the top tier men's basketball league on Iceland, then known as 1. deild karla. The season started on January 4, 1970 and ended on March 21, 1970.

ÍR won their tenth title by beating Ármann 2-0 in the playoffs finals for championship. KR finished in third place after beating KFR, two games to none, in a best-of-three series.

Þórir Magnússon led all players in scoring during the regular season, scoring 292 points in 10 games, or 29.2 points per game.

Competition format
The participating teams played each other twice for a total of 10 games. The top four teams would then enter a playoffs for the championship. ÍR won a coin toss with KR for the first seed.

Regular season

Playoffs

Extra game
KFR and Njarðvík ended tied in 4-5th place with 6 points and therefore played an extra game to decide which team would go to the playoffs.

Bracket

Semifinals

|}

Third place

|}

Final

|}

Notable occurrences
On March 7, it was reported that KR had added former Indonesian national team player David Janis to the team.
On March 11, it was reported that KR had added Icelandic national team player Hjörtur Hansson to the team. He had previously been playing with Lugi in the Swedish Division II.

References

External links
Official Icelandic Basketball Federation website

Úrvalsdeild karla (basketball)